Admiral Lowry may refer to:

Frank J. Lowry (1888–1955), U.S. Navy vice admiral
George M. Lowry (1889–1981), U.S. Navy rear admiral
Robert Lowry (Royal Navy officer) (1854–1920), British Royal Navy admiral